Moxie is a historic trimaran sailboat. It was custom designed by Dick Newick and built by Walter Greene to the  OSTAR race waterline length limit at Handy Boat, Cousins River, Yarmouth, Maine. It was launched in 1980.

Skippered by Philip Weld, Moxie won the Observer Single-Handed Trans-Atlantic Race (OSTAR) that year.

On 7th of October 2022, Moxie is qualified to participate to the Route du Rhum 2022 skippered by Thomas Lurton.

See also
List of multihulls

References

 Moxie website
Trimarans
1980s sailing yachts